Kanizsa  may refer to:

Nagykanizsa, a town in Hungary
Kanije Province, Ottoman Empire
Captaincy of Kanizsa, military district in the Kingdom of Hungary
Kaniža, Šentilj, a settlement in the municipality of Šentilj, Slovenia
Kanizsamonostor, Kanizsa-Monostor (aka Torontálmonostor)
Magyarkanizsa, the Hungarian name for Kanjiža town, Vojvodina, Serbia
Szörénykanizsa, the Hungarian name for Cănicea village, Domașnea Commune, Caraș-Severin County, Romania
Törökkanizsa, the Hungarian name for Novi Kneževac town, Vojvodina, Serbia

People with the surname
Gaetano Kanizsa (1913–1993), Hungarian-Italian psychologist and artist
Gina Kanizsa (born 1988), Hungarian jazz singer
Tivadar Kanizsa (1933–1975), Hungarian water polo player

See also
Kaniža (disambiguation)

Hungarian-language surnames